Maha Vajirunhis, Crown Prince of Siam (27 June 1878 – 4 January 1895) was the first Crown Prince of the Chakri dynasty. He was the first son of King Chulalongkorn and Queen Savang Vadhana together, who were half-siblings.

The King built a palace for the Prince, nicknamed Windsor Palace. The European-style palace was demolished after his death. The site is now occupied by the National Stadium of Thailand.

Heir apparent

In 1886, after the death of the last Vice King Bovorn Vichaichan, King Chulalongkorn chose not to appoint one of his brothers as a new Vice King, but instead appointed his eldest son as the Crown Prince of Siam. On 14 January 1886, he was officially introduced to his position with the title of Sayam Makutrajakuman, or Crown Prince of Siam. From this appointment Sir Ernest Mason Satow, the British ambassador to Thailand, brought a telegraph of congratulations from Queen Victoria of the United Kingdom.

Private interests
Prince Vajirunhis was interested in the liberal arts, writing daily in a diary he was given by his father at the age of five. He wrote many poems. One, written for his father on 25 October 1888, is below:

Death
He died unexpectedly of typhoid fever at age 16, long before he could reach the throne. King Chulalongkorn's second son, Prince Vajiravudh, was then named crown prince, and succeeded him as Rama VI in 1910.

Ancestry

References

External links

 Soravij
 'The Crown Prince of Siam', 1894, Science & Society Picture Library

1878 births
1895 deaths
19th-century Thai people
19th-century Chakri dynasty
Thai male Chao Fa
Crown Princes of Thailand
Heirs apparent who never acceded
Knights Grand Cross of the Order of Chula Chom Klao
Vajirunhis
Children of Chulalongkorn
Sons of kings